Skins! Bongo Party with Les Baxter is an album by Les Baxter's Drums. It was released in 1957 on the Capitol label (catalog nos. T-774).

The album debuted on Billboard magazine's popular albums chart on March 16, 1957, peaked at No. 21, and remained on that chart for two weeks.

Track listing
Side 1
 "Afro-Desia" (Les Baxter)
 "Brazilian Bash" (Les Baxter)
 "Bustin' the Bongos" (Dave Dexter)
 "Conversation" (Les Baxter)
 "Poppin' Panderos" (Les Baxter)

Side 2
 "Talkin' Drums" (Les Baxter)
 "Reverberasia" (Les Baxter)
 "Shoutin' Drums" (Les Baxter)
 "Gringo" (Les Baxter)
 "Mood Tattooed" (Lex Baxter)

References

1957 albums
Capitol Records albums
Les Baxter albums